Cyrillic Extended-C is a Unicode block containing Cyrillic characters for facsimile reprinting Old Believer service books. They are graphic variants of standard Cyrillic rather than distinct letters.

History
The following Unicode-related documents record the purpose and process of defining specific characters in the Cyrillic Extended-C block:

References 

Unicode blocks